= Juvenile justice in Pakistan =

Juvenile justice in Pakistan deals with crimes committed by Pakistani children. The minimum age for criminal responsibility in Pakistan is seven years. According to a SPARC report published in 2012 there were 1500 to 2000 juveniles (under-18 children) imprisoned in Pakistan. This figure, however, excludes thousands of under trials whose number is unknown. Anees Jillani opines that one of the reasons for the large number of children coming into conflict with the law is the low age of criminal responsibility, which is seven years under section 82 of the Pakistan Penal Code 1860 (No XLV) Additionally, section 83 of the Pakistan Penal Code says that nothing is an offense which is done by a child above seven years of age and under the age of twelve, who has not attained sufficient maturity of understanding to judge the nature and consequences of his or her conduct on that occasion.

In July 2000, the then government under General Pervez Musharraf enacted the JSSO (Juvenile Justice System Ordinance 2000)(No XXII), according to SPARC(2001) its implementation is incomplete. A survey of juvenile prisoners lodged in 51 jails in the four provinces of Pakistan exposed most degrading conditions. Hardly any facilities existed for rehabilitation and often the punishment was too severe for the crimes committed. Most of the incarcerated children were found to be under-trials. Under-trial prisoners failed to obtain release on bail as their poverty prevented them from furnishing sureties.
